Panarea is the smallest of the seven inhabited Aeolian Islands, a volcanic island chain in north of Sicily, southern Italy.  It is a frazione of the comune of Lipari. There are currently about 280 residents living on the island year-round; however the population increases dramatically in summer with the influx of tourists especially during the months of July and August.  In recent years, the island has become known internationally for its celebrity visitors.

Geography
The island is an active volcano with a total surface area of only . There are thermal springs near the village of Punta di Peppe e Maria. Scuba diving is a popular excursion on this tiny island, and you can even swim to a shipwreck between the offshore rocks of Lisca Bianca and Bottaro.

The island is surrounded by several islets and skerries reachable only by boat that make Panarea unique and easily distinguishable between the other Aeolian islands. 

These islets and skerries are: Basiluzzo and Spinazzola, Pietra Nave, Dattilo, Lisca Bianca and Bottaro, Lisca Nera, Le Formiche.

History
In antiquity, the island was named "Euonymos"; the nearby islet of Basiluzzo, administered from Panarea, was named "Hycesia". There is archaeological evidence on the island dating back to Greek inhabitants (~ 1200 BCE); later the island was settled by Romans.  There were people still living on the island until pirates and other Mediterranean raiders made life unbearable after the fall of the Western Roman Empire.

In modern times, Panarea has become a fashionable vacation spot. In 2011, it was described by W magazine as "the epicenter of the chicest summer scene in the Mediterranean."

Panarea and the entire Aeolian chain were declared a UNESCO World Heritage Site in 2000. Largely because of this, construction and development are strictly regulated and the community retains its storied insularity. Most residences admit only temporary occupancy, and the few year-round homes available are highly expensive and difficult to obtain.

Gallery

See also
List of volcanoes in Italy
 List of islands of Italy

References

External links

panarea.com 
Panarea volcanic island, Italy

Frazioni of the Metropolitan City of Messina
Aeolian Islands
Volcanoes of Italy